Tezcuco is a former plantation in Burnside, Louisiana, U.S.. It was built c. 1855 for Benjamin Tureaud, and designed in the Greek Revival architectural style. The plantation remained in the Bringier-Tureaud family until 1950, when it was purchased by Dr. and Mrs. Robert H. Potts. In 1982, the owner prior to the fire, Annette Harland, obtained the land from the Potts Family and turned the plantation into a bed and breakfast in 1983.

The house was listed on the National Register of Historic Places on March 3, 1983, and was delisted on January 31, 2019.

It burnt down in May 2002. the cause of the fire is undetermined. Ruins of the columns are still visible.

References

https://www.tureaud.com/plantation_home_burns.htm
https://www.bellaonline.com/articles/art3114.asp

See also
National Register of Historic Places listings in Ascension Parish, Louisiana

Houses on the National Register of Historic Places in Louisiana
Greek Revival architecture in Louisiana
Houses completed in 1855
Houses in Ascension Parish, Louisiana
Plantations in Louisiana
Buildings and structures demolished in 2002
Former National Register of Historic Places in Louisiana